SC Heerenveen Vrouwen is a Dutch women's football (soccer) club based in Heerenveen representing SC Heerenveen in the Vrouwen Eredivisie, the top women's league in the Netherlands.

Founded in 2007, Heerenveen was a founding member of the Vrouwen Eredivisie. After finishing last in 2008 and 2010 and second-to-last in 2009, in 2011 it attained its best result yet, finishing 4th and reaching the national cup final, lost against AZ Alkmaar. In April 2011 the club announced the women's team would be disbanded following the end of the season, but it subsequently cancelled the decision. The following season Heerenveen returned to the bottom of the table, ending last.

In the 2012–13 season, Heerenveen moved in the newly founded BeNe League. It was the second-to-last Dutch team in the championship, an overall 11th position.

Competition record

x = season abandoned due to Covid-19

a = at time of cancellation of season due to Covid-19

Players

Current squad

.

Source: uk.women.soccerway.com

Former players

Former internationals

 Cynthia Beekhuis
 Marije Brummel
 Nicole Delies
 Nangila van Eyck
 Lieke Martens
 Vivianne Miedema
 Shanice van de Sanden
 Sylvia Smit
 Sherida Spitse
 Lianne de Vries

Head coaches

  Harry Sinkgraven (2007–2009)
  Rick Mulder (2009–2011)
  Peter Meindertsma (2011–2012)
  Maarten de Jong (2012)
  Jessica Torny (2012–2015)
  Fred de Boer (2015–2016)
  Jan Schulting (2016–)
  Roeland ten Berge

Broadcasting
As of the 2020–21 season, league matches played on Sunday are broadcast on Fox Sports. Public service broadcaster NOS occasionally broadcasts some Sunday games live and provides game highlights during the Studio Sport programme.

References

BeNe League teams
Eredivisie (women) teams
Heerenveen
Women
Heerenveen
2007 establishments in the Netherlands
Football clubs in Heerenveen